Arsala Khan railway station is located in Pakistan.

See also
 List of railway stations in Pakistan
 Pakistan Railways

References

Railway stations on Daud Khel–Lakki Marwat Branch Line
Railway stations in Lakki Marwat District